Solutions is the third studio album by American musician K.Flay, released by Interscope Records and its imprint Night Street Records on July 12, 2019. The first single, "Bad Vibes", was released on March 1, 2019. Lyric videos were also released for "This Baby Don't Cry", "Sister", and "Not in California".

Background 
K.Flay wrote "Not in California" after visiting Stinson Beach, California, a place that she thought "seemed to be untouched by the problems of modern society".

Track listing

Charts

References

2019 albums
K.Flay albums